Bank of America Tower (until 2017: D. R. Horton Tower) is a building in Fort Worth, Texas. At , it is the second tallest building in Fort Worth. It has 38 floors. It was completed in 1984. It is surrounded by Calhoun Street, East 2nd Street, Commerce Street, and East 3rd Street. It is the taller of the two towers in the City Center Towers Complex. The two buildings are similar in that they resemble pinwheels, but they are not true twins. The building was formerly the headquarters of D. R. Horton, a home construction company, and it is now primarily occupied by Bank of America.

See also
 List of tallest buildings in Fort Worth

References

1984 establishments in Texas
Modernist architecture in Texas
Office buildings completed in 1984
Skyscraper office buildings in Fort Worth, Texas